William Rémy (born 4 April 1991) is a French professional footballer. He plays as a central defender for Belgian club Virton and is a former French youth international, having starred for the under-17, under-18, and under-19 teams.

Club career
Born in Courbevoie, Rémy joined Pas-de-Calais-based club Lens in 2004. He made his professional football debut on 13 October 2008 in a Ligue 2 match against Guingamp coming on as a substitute playing 8 minutes. Rémy also appeared in his club's upset loss to Championnat de France amateur 2 side and lesser rivals Arras Football in the Coupe de France coming on as a substitute in the 81st minute and playing the entire extra time session before watching his club bow out 4–2 on penalties.

In August 2011 Rémy had a trial at Newcastle United along with Darnel Situ. Both Remy and Situ scored in their debut for the reserves in a 5–0 victory over Gateshead.

After four years with Lens, Rémy moved to the Ligue 2 side Dijon FCO on a three-year contract.

In January 2018, he joined Polish club Legia Warsaw from Montpellier HSC on a -year deal. On 18 December 2020, his contract with Legia was terminated.

On 25 December 2021, Rémy agreed to join Virton in Belgium.

International career
Rémy was a France youth international. He was a part of the France U-17 squad that finished runners-up at the 2008 UEFA European Under-17 Football Championship. In a group stage match against Spain, he scored on a volley off a corner kick. The goal gave France a 3–2 lead, though Spain would later score and the match would end in a draw.

Honours
Legia Warsaw
Ekstraklasa: 2017–18, 2019–20, 2020–21
Polish Cup: 2017–18

References

External links
 
 
 LFP Profile
 Foot-National Profile

Living people
1991 births
People from Courbevoie
Footballers from Hauts-de-Seine
Association football central defenders
French footballers
France youth international footballers
ESA Linas-Montlhéry players
RC Lens players
US Créteil-Lusitanos players
Dijon FCO players
Montpellier HSC players
Legia Warsaw players
R.E. Virton players
Ligue 1 players
Ligue 2 players
Ekstraklasa players
Challenger Pro League players
French expatriate footballers
Expatriate footballers in Poland
French expatriate sportspeople in Poland
Expatriate footballers in Belgium
French expatriate sportspeople in Belgium